The No. Six Affiliated Hospital of Xinjiang Medical University is a teaching hospital in Urumqi, Xinjiang, China affiliated with Xinjiang Medical University. It was established in 1957 as Xinjiang Jiangong Hospital.

Notes

Xinjiang Medical University
Hospital XMU 6
Hospitals in Xinjiang
1957 establishments in China
Hospitals established in 1957